is a Japanese politician of the Liberal Democratic Party, a member of the House of Councillors in the Diet (national legislature).

Biography
A native of Oyabe, Toyama and a graduate of Waseda University, he was elected for the first time in 2007.

References

External links 
 Official website in Japanese.

Members of the House of Councillors (Japan)
Waseda University alumni
1946 births
Living people
Liberal Democratic Party (Japan) politicians